War Story is a 1989 animated short film created by Aardman Animations. It was directed by Peter Lord.

Production
The film was commissioned by Channel 4 as part of a 5-part series of Aardman animations called "Lip Synch". The five films in the series were Creature Comforts (1989), Going Equipped (1990), Ident (1990), Next (1990) and War Story (1989).  They all used vox pop interviews as their source material. This one is with a genuine British World War II vet.

Premise
Imdb explains: "This short animated piece uses a real interview as its soundtrack. Bill Perry relates stories about his youth, his tilted house, and adventures during WWII in Bristol, England during the blitz."

Cast
 Bill Perry - Himself (voice)
 Peter Lawrence - Interviewer (voice)

Critical reception
War Story received a rating of 6.3/10 from 172 users on imdb.

Awards and nominations
This is a list of awards and nominations of War Story.

|-
| 1990
| Sara Mullock and Peter Lord 
| BAFTA Film Award for Best Animated Film
| 
|-
| 1990
| Peter Lord  
| Ottawa International Animation Festival Craft Prize for Best Animation
| 
|-
| 1990
| Peter Lord 
| Ottawa International Animation Festival OIAF Award for Best Film Under 10 Minutes
| 
|-
|}

Preservation
War Story was preserved by the Academy Film Archive in 2013.

References

1989 films
1989 animated films
1980s animated short films
1980s war films
Aardman Animations short films
British animated short films
Films directed by Peter Lord
World War II films based on actual events
1980s English-language films
1980s British films